Taylor Wray (born June 27, 1981) is a Canadian lacrosse coach and former player. Wray is the current Head Coach of the Saint Joseph's University men's lacrosse team. Wray played for the Calgary Roughnecks  and Philadelphia Wings of the National Lacrosse League. Taylor's older brother Devan Wray is a former NLL player and former assistant coach for the Edmonton Rush.

Professional career
Born in Edmonton, Alberta, Wray began his career with the Calgary Roughnecks in 2004, and won the NLL Championship with the Roughnecks that year. Wray was named both Rookie of the Year and Defensive Player of the Year in 2004.

In July 2007, Wray was traded to the Philadelphia Wings in a three-team blockbuster trade.

Prior to the 2008 NCAA season, Wray was named Assistant Coach of the Lehigh University lacrosse team, under Head Coach Kevin Cassese. Prior to this, He had served as Assistant Coach for Queens University of Charlotte.

During the summer of 2011, Wray was named Head Coach of the Saint Joseph's University men's lacrosse team. Prior to the start of the 2013 season, Philadelphia head coach Johnny Mouradian announced that Wray has told the team he will not be returning to Wings.

Statistics

NLL

Awards

References

1981 births
Calgary Roughnecks players
Canadian lacrosse players
Lehigh Mountain Hawks coaches
Living people
National Lacrosse League All-Stars
National Lacrosse League major award winners
Philadelphia Wings players
Queens University of Charlotte
Sportspeople from Edmonton